The War of Art is the second studio album by industrial metal band American Head Charge, released on August 28, 2001 through American Recordings. It was produced by Rick Rubin. Several songs on the album were re-recorded from the band's self-released debut album Trepanation (1999).

The War of Art received positive reviews from critics and debuted at number 118 on the Billboard 200 and number one on the Top Heatseekers chart. The album also charted at number 90 on the UK Albums Chart. By 2015, the album had sold 250,000 copies worldwide. In 2022, Metal Hammer ranked the album as the 20th greatest nu metal album of all time.

Album information
The album was recorded at Rick Rubin's allegedly haunted recording studio. The title is a play on words of the Chinese book The Art of War by Sun Tzu. This is the band's only album with Aaron Zilch on samplers, and David Rogers and Wayne Kile together on guitar. After the departure of Zilch, Fowler remained the band's sole keyboardist/sampler.

The album landed American Head Charge a spot at Ozzfest 2001. Their concerts featured some controversy due to the band firing shotguns and burning American flags on stage. A live version of the song "Reach and Touch" appears on the album Ozzfest 2001: The Second Millennium. A live version of "Seamless" appears on the album Pledge of Allegiance Tour: Live Concert Recording. Music videos were released for "Just So You Know" and "All Wrapped Up".

Commercial performance 
The War of Art debuted at number 118 on the Billboard 200 chart, with first-week sales of 12,000 copies, with 4,000 copies of those copies being sold in the album's first day of release. The album's sales surpassed the expectations of the band and American Recordings, who believed it would only manage to sell 7,000 copies in its first week. By 2015, The War of Art had sold over 250,000 copies worldwide.

Reception

The War of Art received positive reviews from critics. AllMusic called the album "brutal, loud, and insanely intense" and that "the band is one of the most intelligent, interesting, and compelling metal bands to surface." CMJ said, "aiming its cannons, grenades and shotguns at point-blank range... its spliced with programming and aggro geetars." NME called it an "outstanding slab of modern heavy metal."

Katherine Turman said that "sirens, industrial noise, and ultra-intense vocals kick off The War of Art's aptly titled opening cut A Violent Reaction", and that the band have "deftly produced, well-conceived, and fully realized songs and approach." Metal Observer called it "an album that forms a unity for itself and wins in power and intensity with each repeated listen." AntiMusic said that "from start to finish The War of Art is an uncompromising heavy album filled with righteous screams, in your face bass and drums and searing guitars." Rough Edge said that the album "is one hour plus of blistering, mind blowing, molten metal" and that "song after song after song is nothing less than a pure metal experience."

Accolades

Track listing 

 Track 9 is titled "Title of Song Removed for Your Safety" on the rear cover.

Music videography

Credits 
Personnel per liner notes.

American Head Charge
Cameron Heacock – vocals
Chad Hanks – bass, guitar, programming
Justin Fowler – keyboards, samples
David Rogers – guitar
Wayne Kile – guitar
Aaron Zilch – keyboards, electronics
Chris Emery – drums

Other personnel
Rick Rubin – producer
Billy Bowers – editing
Lindsay Chase – project coordinator
Rich Costey – remixing, mixing
Greg Fidelman – engineer
Dean Karr – photography
Steve Mixdorf – engineer
Marc Moreau – editing
Jeremy Parker – assistant engineer
Gary Richards – manager
Eddy Schreyer – mastering
Justin Smith – mixing, remix assistant

Chart positions

Release history

References

External links 
Music videos of "Just So You Know" and "All Wrapped Up"

2001 albums
American Head Charge albums
Albums produced by Rick Rubin
American Recordings (record label) albums
Albums recorded at The Mansion (recording studio)